A physical therapy practice act is a statute defining the scope and practice of physical therapy within the jurisdiction, outlining licensing requirements for Physical Therapists and Physical Therapist Assistants, and establishing penalties for violations of the law.  In the United States, each state enacts its own practice act, resulting in some variation among the states, though the Federation of State Boards of Physical Therapy (FSBPT) has drafted a model definition in order to limit this variation.

Model definition of physical therapy for state practice acts
In 1997, the Federation of State Boards of Physical Therapy (FSBPT) published The Model Practice Act for Physical Therapy: A Tool for Public Protection and Legislative Change as a model framework to serve as a basis for inter-jurisdictional consistency among state physical therapy practice acts.  The FSBPT published the 5th edition of this document in 2011. According to the introduction to the Fifth edition, "since 1997 many states have enacted large portions and, in some instances, nearly the entire Model Practice Act as their jurisdiction statute."

List of practice acts

References

External links
APTA List of PT practice acts by state
FSBPT List of PT licensing authorities

Physical therapy